Events from the year 1917 in art.

Events
 January – A drunken Amedeo Modigliani is ejected from a party for Georges Braque, by the hostess, Marie Vassilieff.
 January 29 – Rodin marries his mistress, Rose Beuret; she dies two weeks later.
 Eric Kennington, William Orpen, C. R. W. Nevinson, Paul Nash and William Rothenstein are sent as war artists to the Western Front from England.
 De Stijl artistic movement is established by Theo van Doesburg.
 The Allen Memorial Art Museum is established at Oberlin College in Ohio.
 The Marc Chagall illustrated version of The Magician (דער קונצענמאכער, Der Kuntsenmakher) by I. L. Peretz (d. 1915) is published in Vilnius.

Works

 Max Beckmann – Deposition (Museum of Modern Art, New York)
 Lovis Corinth – Portrait of Julius Meier-Graefe
 Heinrich Maria Davringhausen – The Poet Däubler
 Marcel Duchamp (anonymously) – Fountain (readymade)
 Jacob Epstein – An American Soldier (bust)
Daniel Chester French – Lafayette Memorial
 Elsa von Freytag-Loringhoven – God (readymade sculpture)
 J. W. Godward
 The Fruit Vendor
 A Lily Pond
 Under The Blossom That Hangs On The Bough
 George Grosz
 The City
 Explosion
 Metropolis
 Rudolf Alfred Höger – Nach dem Vorstoß, Russische Kriegsgefangene (After the Foray: Russian Prisoners of War)
 Paul Klee – Ab ovo
 Gustav Klimt – Portrait of a Lady
 Isidore Konti – Nymph and Fawn (bronze fountain)
 Boris Kustodiev – Portrait of Countess Grabowska
 Hans Larwin – Soldat und Tod
 Fernand Léger – The Card Game
 L. S. Lowry – Coming from the Mill
 Maximilien Luce
 The Execution of Varlin
 La Gare de l'Est in snow
 George Luks – Houston Street
 Henri Matisse
 The Music Lesson
 The Painter and His Model
 Joan Miró
 Portrait of Vincent Nubiola
 The Village
 Amedeo Modigliani
 Anna Zborowska
 Nu couché ("Reclining Nude")
 Nude Sitting on a Divan
 C. R. W. Nevinson
 After a Push
 Britain's Efforts and Ideals series of lithographs
 A Group of Soldiers
 A Howitzer Gun in Elevation
 Over the Lines
 Paths of Glory
 The Road from Arras to Bapaume
 Swooping Down on a Hostile Plane
 A Tank
 Hilda Rix Nicholas – Desolation (approximate date; destroyed)
 Georgia O'Keeffe – Light Coming on the Plains (watercolor series)
 William Orpen
 An Airman – Lieutenant R.T.C. Hoidge MC
 Blown Up, Mad
 Field-Marshal Sir Douglas Haig
 German 'Planes Visiting Cassel
 A Highlander Passing a Grave
 Ready to Start: Self Portrait
 Schwaben Redoubt
 Self-portrait
 Theipval
 The Thinker on the Butte de Warlencourt (original pencil & watercolour version)
 View from the Old British Trenches, Looking towards La Boisselle, Courcelette on the Left, Martinpuich on the Right
 Glyn Philpot
 Siegfried Sassoon
 A Young Breton (Guillaume Rolland)
 Pablo Picasso – Olga Picasso in an Armchair
 Auguste Rodin – The Gates of Hell (sculpture unfinished at his death)
 Egon Schiele – The Embrace
 Zinaida Serebriakova – Bleaching Cloth
 Charles Sheeler – Doylestown House – Stairs from Below (photograph)
 John French Sloan – Passing through Gloucester
 Alfred Stieglitz – The Last Days of 291 (photograph)
 Tom Thomson
 April in Algonquin Park
 The Jack Pine (National Gallery of Canada)
 The West Wind
 Félix Vallotton
 The Church of Souain in Silhouette
 Senegalese Soldiers at the camp of Mailly
 J. W. Waterhouse – Fair Rosamund
 Christopher Williams – The Red Dress

Births
 9 January – Virginia Surtees, English art historian and biographer (d. 2017)
 5 February – Lucienne Day, née Conradi, British textile designer (d. 2010)
 20 February – Manny Farber, American painter and film critic (d. 2008)
 20 February – Louisa Matthíasdóttir, Icelandic-American painter (d. 2000)
 1 March – Tom Keating, English art restorer and art faker (d. 1984)
 12 March – Milton Resnick, American painter (d. 2004)
 24 March – Constantine Andreou, Greek painter and sculptor (d. 2007)
 6 April – Leonora Carrington, English-born surrealist painter working in Mexico (d. 2011)
 21 May – Frank Bellamy, English comics artist (d. 1976)
 12 July – Andrew Wyeth, American painter (d. 2009)
 14 July – Ben Enwonwu, Nigerian painter and sculptor (d. 1994)
 11 August – Dik Browne, American cartoonist (d. 1989)
 28 August – Jack Kirby, American comic book artist, writer and editor (d. 1994)
 3 September – Anthony Robert Klitz, English artist (d. 2000)
 7 September – Jacob Lawrence, African American painter (d. 2000)
 11 September – Daniel Wildenstein, French international art dealer and scholar (d. 2001)
 25 December – John Minton, English painter and illustrator (suicide 1957)

Deaths

 January 15 – William De Morgan, English ceramic artist (b. 1839)
 January 21 – Francesca Alexander, American illustrator (b. 1837)
 February 10 – John William Waterhouse, Italian-born artist (b. 1849)
 February 17 – Carolus-Duran, French painter (b. 1837)
 March 27 – Moses Jacob Ezekiel, American sculptor working in Italy (b. 1844)
 March 28 – Albert Pinkham Ryder, American painter (b. 1847)
 April 23 – Robert Koehler, German American painter (b. 1850)
 June 30 – Antonio de La Gandara, French painter (b. 1861)
 July 8 – Tom Thomson, Canadian painter (b. 1877) (drowned during a canoeing trip on Canoe Lake in Algonquin Park)
 September 27 – Edgar Degas, French painter and sculptor (b. 1834)
 October 14 – Nathaniel Hone the Younger, Irish painter (b. 1831)
 October 23 – Eugène Grasset, Swiss artist (b. 1845)
 November 17
 Sir Charles Holroyd, English etcher (b. 1861)
 Auguste Rodin, French sculptor (b. 1840)
 December 21 – Wilhelm Trübner, German painter (b. 1851)
 (date unknown) – Raffaele Belliazzi, Italian sculptor (b. 1835)

References

 
Years of the 20th century in art
1910s in art